William de Pakyngton (also William Pakington) (fl. 1370s - 1390s) was a Canon of Windsor in 1381 and Dean of Lichfield.

Career
He was appointed:
King's Clerk
Rector of Burton Noveree (diocese of Lincoln) until 1372
Keeper of the King's Wardrobe 1377
Prebendary of Mapesbury in St Paul's until 1390
Dean of St Martin's le Grand 1389 - 1390
Parson at Ivinghoe (diocese of Lincoln) 1381
Rector of Wearmouth (diocese of Durham) 1381 - 1382
Chancellor of the Exchequer 1381
Prebendary of Waltham in Chichester 1385 - 1391
Dean of Lichfield 1381 - 1390
Dean of Stafford 1380 - 1390

He was appointed to the twelfth stall in St George's Chapel, Windsor Castle in 1381 and held the canonry only for one month.

Notes 

Canons of Windsor
Deans of Lichfield
Year of birth missing
Year of death missing